The Man of the Woods Tour was the sixth concert tour by American singer-songwriter Justin Timberlake. Launched in support of his fifth studio album, Man of the Woods (2018), the tour began on March 13, 2018, in Toronto and concluded on April 13, 2019, in Uncasville. The Man of the Woods Tour was the sixth-highest-grossing tour of 2018. During its thirteen-month run from March 2018 to April 2019, The Man of the Woods Tour sold over 1.75 million tickets and grossed a total of over $226.3 million from 115 shows, making it Timberlake's second most successful tour to date behind only The 20/20 Experience World Tour, which grossed over $231.6 million from 134 shows, though Timberlake's per-night basis for The Man of the Woods Tour had a higher average at $1.96 million per-show than that of The 20/20 Experience World Tour, which averaged $1.81 million per-show.

Background
The tour was first announced in January 2018, and due to demand additional dates were released soon after. On February 5, 2018, the day following Timberlake's Super Bowl LII halftime show, Timberlake announced European tour dates, as well as second and third North American tour dates. Timberlake toured Europe after the first North American leg, then toured North America again starting in the fall. The third North American leg began in January 2019. 
From November to December 2018, due to Timberlake suffering from bruised vocal cords, he was forced to postpone all remaining 2018 tour dates, resulting in the tour concluding in April 2019.

Show
During a portion of the concert, Timberlake and his band the "Tennessee Kids" sing around a campfire. The "Stage Bar" VIP Experience on the tour includes a bar near the center stage, and a drink ticket. A disco dance floor is near the stage, where Timberlake performs "Rock Your Body"

Commercial performance
In May 2018, Billboard reported grosses totalling $36.6 million from the first five weeks, with 255,780 attendees at 16 shows, thus reaching number one on the magazine's weekly ranking Hot Tours. The magazine expects the tour to reach a total of $275 million and 2 million attendees by the time it concludes. Timberlake's sold-out Orlando concert on May 14 was the highest-grossing, single-day concert in Amway Center history with $2,387,112 and 17,839 attendees.

Timberlake's September 20 night concert at Rupp Arena grossed $2 million, making it the highest-grossing one-night concert in the arena's history, besting the previous record set by the Eagles, which grossed $1.8 million in June 2015.

His January 26, 2019 concert at the Chesapeake Energy Arena set a new record for highest-grossing show in Oklahoma City's history.

StubHub named Timberlake the fifth-best selling live artist in the US in 2018. According to Billboard, The Man of the Woods Tour was the sixth-highest-grossing tour of the year, selling over 1,175,216 tickets and grossing over $149 million in 2018. The tour received a nomination for Best Pop Tour at the 30th Pollstar Awards.

During its thirteen-month run from March 2018 to April 2019, The Man of the Woods Tour sold over 1.75 million tickets and grossed a total of over $226.3 million from 115 shows, making it Timberlake's second most successful tour to date behind only The 20/20 Experience World Tour, which grossed over $231.6 million from 134 shows, though Timberlake's per-night basis for The Man of the Woods Tour had a higher average at $1.96 million per-show than that of The 20/20 Experience World Tour, which averaged $1.81 million per-show.

Critical reception
 
The tour received generally positive reviews from critics. Toronto Star journalist Nick Krewen, who attended the opening date, gave it a score of four-out-of-four, writing "[the] stellar tour kickoff delivers the hits and the spectacle... Even with some of the most elaborate, sophisticated visual technology available at his disposal, pop superstar Justin Timberlake managed to have his campfire moment at the Air Canada Centre Tuesday night. With a literal campfire." Chicago Tribunes Bob Gendron, who attended the show at the United Center, praised the spectacle and said "Parade leader. Spurned lover. Assertive dancer. Down-on-his-knees relationship savior. Bartender who handed shots out to his large ensemble. Outdoors lover who gathered around a campfire to play familiar songs. Timberlake embraced an array of roles, blurring the lines between entertainer, singer and actor." Adam Graham of the Detroit News wrote it "was an engrossing spectacle that turned the arena into his personal wooded playland; no concert artist has come close to using Little Caesars Arena’s space this creatively, save for perhaps Lady Gaga. [...] Timberlake was cool and commanding, taking the stage in a jean jacket and track pants and still looking like he owned the place." Graham also praised Timberlake's band the Tennessee Kids, "[they] became his own E Street Band — there were times, especially when the band turned around and played to the fans at the back of the arena, that the show recalled a Bruce Springsteen concert."

Alim Kheraj of GQ, after attending the concert at London's O2 Arena, described Timberlake as "one of the greatest live performers of all time." "Timberlake and the Man of the Woods Tour has its secret weapon: captivation. With more than two decades of experience in the entertainment industry, he knows how to maintain an audience's attention, how to mould them so they’re pumped at his signals and (mostly) when to take his foot off the accelerator. [...] Similarly, unlike a legacy artist, his show is still exciting, carefully crafted to bring fans the best in audio-visual technology while ensuring that, musically, things line up too."
 
Franklin Soults of The Boston Globe described the first half of the show as "ritzy glamour," with the "undercut with casual outfits and attitudes that made the extravaganza feel almost relaxed, like a professional athlete’s seemingly effortless performance during a career-topping late season." Despite describing the sing-along around the campfire as "clumsy," he did believe that Timberlake won the crowd back towards the end of the show. The Oakland Press Gary Graff said "You'd be hard-pressed to find a production that makes full use of an arena in as complete a way as Timberlake is doing" and opined "the whole affair was tightly choreographed to appear precision at times, loose and improvisational at others. Timberlake and company were best when they were at their funkiest." Peter Larsen in Daily Breeze said in his review that Timberlake delivered "with swagger and style in a terrific night at the Forum," and noted the opening act The Shadowboxers "surely won over many with their energetic performance."

Jimmie Tramel of Tulsa World said Timberlake brought "cool factor" to BOK Center, and noted his "appeal is such that among those spotted walking into the arena was state senator and former University of Tulsa football coach David Rader." Ed Masley of The Arizona Republic said "there were plenty of breathtaking nature scenes projected on the scrims that dotted the arena," while "it felt more like a night at the club in downtown Phoenix than a trip to Payson," about Timberlake he commented, "he's only gotten better, as he proved repeatedly in the course of a heavily choreographed performance. His sense of showmanship has also gotten stronger through the years."

Billboard critics ranked The Man of the Woods Tour as one of the best live shows of 2018.

David Menconi of The News & Observer said "Justin Timberlake returns to the stage and proves why he's America's pop star", and noted him as "The Prince of Pop". He also said of the show that Timberlake "Sang quite well... But he danced even better, and that's what turned the crowd on most of all. How he moved was at least as important as how he sang." Chris Conde of San Antonio Current deemed it "an spectacle of undeniable talent... Even if you don’t like pop music, Timberlake's show was so rich in musicianship and showmanship that anyone wanting to say something bad would be hard-pressed to, ahem, justify a negative review."

Set list
The following set list is from the show on March 13, 2018, in Toronto. It is not representative of all concerts for the duration of the tour.

"Filthy"
"Midnight Summer Jam"
"LoveStoned"
"SexyBack"
"Man of the Woods"
"Higher Higher"
"Señorita"
"Suit & Tie" 
"My Love" 
"Cry Me a River"
"Mirrors"
"Drink You Away"
"Flannel"
"Until the End of Time" 
"Dreams" / " Ex-Factor" / "Come Together" / "Thank God I'm a Country Boy" 
"Morning Light"
"What Goes Around... Comes Around"
"Say Something"
"Montana"
"Summer Love"
"Rock Your Body"
"Supplies"
"Can't Stop the Feeling!"

Notes
On May 9, 2018, during the concert in Nashville, Chris Stapleton joined Timberlake on stage to perform "Tennessee Whiskey"
"Like I Love You" was added to the set list between "Supplies" and "Can't Stop the Feeling!", while "Flannel" was later removed.
On January 10, 2019, in Atlanta, T.I. joined Timberlake on stage during "My Love". Moreover, he performed a medley of his songs: "What You Know" / "Bring 'Em Out" / "Live Your Life".
"SoulMate" was performed on the European leg only.

Tour dates

Notes

References

2018 concert tours
2019 concert tours
Justin Timberlake concert tours
Concert tours of North America
Concert tours of Europe